Lazar Antsi-Polovsky was a Soviet actor, film director. Honored Artist of the RSFSR.

Selected filmography 
 1922 – Dolya ty russkaya, dolyushka zhenskaya
 1922 – The Miracle Maker
 1938 – If War Comes Tomorrow

References

External links 
 Лазарь Анци-Половский on kino-teatr.ru

Soviet male film actors
1888 births
1956 deaths